FC Vityaz Krymsk was a Russian football club from Krymsk, Krasnodar Krai, founded in 1994.  It played professionally in the Russian Second Division from 1999 to 2005, playing on amateur level in other years. In 2013 club was brought back to professional level and started playing in 2nd Division again, they finished 2013–2014 season with respectable 3rd place, the best achievement so far. In 2014–15 season, they surpassed that, coming in 2nd in their zone. Before the 2015–16 season, the club did not pass professional licensing.

Club name history
 1994–1995: FC Zarya Krymsk
 1996–2005: FC Vityaz Krymsk
 2006–2013: FC Zarya Krymsk
 2013–2015: FC Vityaz Krymsk

External links
Official Site

Association football clubs established in 1994
Association football clubs disestablished in 2015
Football clubs in Russia
Sport in Krasnodar Krai
1994 establishments in Russia
2015 disestablishments in Russia